The Valdostana Pezzata Rossa is an Italian breed of cattle from Valle d'Aosta region in north-western Italy. It is red-pied, usually with white legs, stomach and face. It is one of three regional breeds in the area, the others being the Valdostana Castana and the Valdostana Pezzata Nera. Like them, it derives from inter-breeding of various local breeds and types of cattle. The most important of these were Swiss Simmental cattle, which came into the Valle d'Aosta over the Great St. Bernard Pass. The Valdostana Pezzata Rossa is a dual-purpose breed, raised mainly for milk, but also for meat. Management is normally transhumant: the cattle are stabled only in winter, and spend the summer months on the mountain pastures of the Alps.

History 

Like the other cattle breeds of the Valle d'Aosta, the Valdostana Castana and the Valdostana Pezzata Nera, the Valdostana Pezzata Rossa derives from inter-breeding of various local breeds and types of cattle. The most important influence on the development and morphology of the Pezzata Rossa came from Swiss Simmental cattle, which came into the region over the Great St. Bernard Pass. In the twentieth century, attempts were made to increase size and productive qualities by cross-breeding with imported stock, including Abondance and Montbéliarde stock from France, and various European strains of Simmental. The resulting increase in size reduced the adaptation of the animals to life on the high mountain pastures, and the experiment was quickly abandoned. A breeders' association, the Associazione Nazionale Allevatori Bovini Razza Valdostana, was started in 1937, and a herd-book was established in 1958.

In 1946 it was thought that were about  head.

The Valdostana Pezzata Rossa is among the eleven breeds which together form the Fédération Européenne des Races Bovines de l'Arc Alpin, the others being: the Pinzgauer and Tiroler Grauvieh from Austria; the Abondance, Tarentaise and Vosgienne from France; the Hinterwälder and Vordelwälder from Germany; the Rendena from Italy; and the Hérens from Switzerland.

Characteristics 

The Valdostana Pezzata Rossa is red-pied. The lower legs, stomach and face are usually white, and the ears red. The muzzle and the mucosa are pink, and the horns short and yellowish. The hooves are particularly hard. Management is transhumant: the cattle are stabled only in winter, and spend the summer months on the mountain pastures of the Alps, moving higher as the season progresses.

Use 

The Valdostana Pezzata Rossa is raised both for milk and for meat. The milk is used to make Fontina, but also in less well-known local cheeses such as Fromadzo, Reblec, Salignum, Seràs and Toma di Gressoney.

References

Cattle breeds originating in Italy